"Puss N' Boots/These Boots (Are Made for Walkin')" is a song by Canadian synth-pop duo Kon Kan, released as the third single from their 1989 album Move to Move. The song peaked at No. 61 in their native Canada, and at No. 58 on the U.S. Billboard Hot 100. In October 1989, the song peaked at No. 11 in New Zealand.

The song includes samples and interpolations of Led Zeppelin's "Immigrant Song" and "Good Times Bad Times", Nancy Sinatra's "These Boots Are Made for Walkin'" and the Champs' "Tequila". The scratch sample that can be heard throughout the song is sampled from Beside's "Change the Beat".

Charts

References

1989 songs
1989 singles
Kon Kan songs
Atlantic Records singles